The 2013–14 season was Manchester City Football Club's 112th season of competitive football, 85th season in the top flight of English football and 17th season in the Premier League.

City became the fastest club in Premier League history to score 100 competitive goals in all competitions and the first to complete this feat before the end of January. They went on to score 156 goals in all competitions, breaking the previous record of 143 goals set by Manchester United in 1956–57. City's 100th Premier League goal of the season was scored in the 4–0 victory over Aston Villa on 7 May 2014. This was the first time the Blues had scored more than 100 league goals in the English top division in a single season since 1957–58. Coincidentally, their 100th goal was notable for another reason, as it became the first goal in all of English league football to be decided via the "Hawk-Eye" system, which had been rolled out for use in English football at the start of the season.

The final tally of 102 league goals was at the time the second-highest Premier League season total and one goal short of Chelsea's 2009–10 record. This was also the first Premier League season where a team had three individual players each score more than 15 goals, with City accomplishing the feat courtesy of Yaya Touré, Sergio Agüero and Edin Džeko.

The 2013–14 season marked the first time City advanced to the round of 16 of the UEFA Champions League. There, the Blues were defeated by Barcelona 4–1 on aggregate. City also recorded their first silverware of the Manuel Pellegrini era on 2 March 2014, when they lifted the Football League Cup. It was the club's first triumph in the competition since 1976.

On 11 May 2014, City won the Premier League for the second time in three seasons following a 2–0 win over West Ham United. It was the first time that Manchester City had won two trophies in a season since 1969–70, when they won the League Cup and the Cup Winners' Cup.

Club

Coaching staff

Kits
The club's kits were supplied by Nike. City's principal sponsor for this year was again Etihad Airways.

Kit information
The club signed a new deal with the American manufacturer Nike, who would supply their kits for the next six years (until 2019).

Home: The new home kit featured a classical design with a round crew neck and sleeve cuffs, trimmed in white and navy. The shorts were white with sky blue trimmings, while the socks were white for the first time since 2009.
Away: The away kit featured a black and charcoal half design, embellished with golden sponsor logos. The shorts and socks were black.
Third: The third kit was predominantly white with a single sky blue and navy stripe on the right hand side. The shorts and socks were navy with sky blue accents.
Keeper: There were four goalkeeper kits used throughout the season. They were based on Nike's premium goalkeeper template, which featured two tones of the same colour. The first choice kit was in two tones of green, whilst the alternatives were purple, yellow and black respectively.

Kit usage

Non-competitive

Pre-season

Football Invitational in support of Mandela Day

Premier League Asia Trophy

Audi Cup

Super Match by Carlsberg

Post-season

Friendlies

Competitions

Overall

Premier League

League table

Results summary

Points breakdown
Points at home: 52
Points away: 34
Points against 2012–13 top four: 10
Points against promoted teams: 15
6 points: Crystal Palace, Everton, Fulham, Hull City, Manchester United, Newcastle, Swansea City, Tottenham, West Brom and West Ham United.
4 points: Arsenal, Norwich City, Southampton and Stoke City.
3 points: Aston Villa, Cardiff City and Liverpool.
1 point: Sunderland.
No points: Chelsea.

Biggest win & loss results
Biggest home win: 7–0 vs. Norwich (2 November 2013)
Biggest and the only home defeat: 0–1 vs. Chelsea, (3 February 2014)
Biggest away win: 5–1 vs. Tottenham (29 January 2014)
Biggest away defeat: 5 by a 1-goal margin.

Biggest home attendance: 47,364 vs. Chelsea, 3 February 2014 
Smallest home attendance: 46,559 vs. Swansea City, 1 December 2013 
Biggest away attendance: 75,203 vs. Manchester United, 25 March 2014 
Smallest away attendance: 20,498 vs. Swansea City, 1 January 2014

Results by matchday

Matches

FA Cup

League Cup

UEFA Champions League

Group stage

Knockout phase

Round of 16

Squad information

First team squad

 
Ordered by squad number.Appearances include all competitive league and cup appearances, including as substitute.

Playing statistics

Appearances (Apps) numbers are for appearances in competitive games only, including sub appearances.Red card numbers denote: numbers in parentheses represent red cards overturned for wrongful dismissal.

Goalscorers
Includes all competitive matches. The list is sorted alphabetically by surname when total goals are equal.

Correct as of game played on 11 May 2014

Awards

PFA Team of the Year
The combined best 11 from all teams in the Premier League chosen by the PFA.

Premier League Manager of the Month award
Awarded monthly to the manager who was chosen by a panel assembled by the Premier League's sponsor.

Premier League Player of the Month award
Awarded monthly to the player chosen by a panel assembled by the Premier League's sponsor.

Etihad Player of the Month awards
Awarded to the player that receives the most votes in a poll conducted each month on the official website of Manchester City.

BBC African Footballer of the Year award
Awarded annually to the player chosen by public vote from a shortlist compiled by experts.

CAF African Player of the Year award
Awarded every calendar year from a shortlist of three based on a vote of the 54 CAF national team managers.

Transfers and loans

Transfers in

Transfers out

Loans out

References

2013–14
Manchester City
Manchester City
2013–14